The Somali Division 3 is the third football division in Somalia. 
The league is contested by 9 clubs

Clubs
As of 2013-14 season:
Bariga Dhexe
Gasko FC
Geeska Afrika
Hilaac
Jamhuuriya TB
Midnimo
Mogadishu United
Raadsan
Singjet

See also
Somali Division 2

References

Football leagues in Somalia
Third level football leagues in Africa